Zen Chong (born on 15 August 1978) is a Malaysian actor who is based in Singapore and contracted artiste under MediaCorp.

Career
Chong joined MediaCorp in 2001 after finishing third in that year's Malaysian edition of Star Search Singapore. One of his first major roles was in the 2003 sitcom Lobang King where he was cast alongside veteran artistes Chew Chor Meng, Huang Wenyong and Irene Ang as the smooth-talking employee of Huang's character.

Chong is known for portraying juvenile "ah beng" characters, antiheroes and villains. He shot to fame for his role as a main antagonist in the hit period drama The Little Nyonya. Although initially a replacement for Andrew Seow, he was praised for his convincing portrayal of antagonist Robert Zhang and won a Best Supporting Actor nomination at the 2009 Star Awards, his first ever awards nomination. He was given his first lead role in the 2008 co-production The Thin Line.

Personal life
A native of the "New Villages" in Kuala Lumpur, Chong studied graphic design and worked at an advertising agency prior to joining Star Search Malaysia. He married his long-time girlfriend Geline in January 2011. Guests at the ceremony included fellow MediaCorp artistes Darren Lim, Christopher Lee, Brandon Wong, Alan Tern and Zhang Yaodong. 

In 2012, it was revealed during the release of The Quarters that Chong changed his a character in his Chinese name after consulting with a fortune teller. His English name was changed as well, from Zzen Chong to Zen Chong.

Filmography

Television

Variety shows

Awards and nominations

References

External links
Profile on xin.msn.com
Profile on MediaCorp TV

Living people
1978 births
Malaysian male actors
Singaporean male television actors
Malaysian people of Chinese descent
Malaysian people of Cantonese descent
People from Kuala Lumpur